In phonetics, a nasal release is the release of a stop consonant into a nasal. Although this is a minor phonetic detail in English (in fact, it is commonly transcribed as having no audible release:), nasal release is more important in some other languages.

Prestopped nasals
In some languages, such consonants may occur before vowels and are called prestopped nasals.

Prestopped nasals and prenasalized stops occur when the oral cavity is closed and the nasal cavity is opened by lowering the velum, but the timing of both events does not coincide. A prenasalized stop starts out with a lowered velum that raises during the occlusion, much like the [nd] in candy. A postnasalized stop or prestopped nasal begins with a raised velum that lowers during the occlusion. That causes an audible nasal release, as in English sudden.

The Slavic languages are most famous for having (non-phonemic) prestopped nasals. That can be seen in place names such as the Dniester River. The Russian word for "day", for example, is inflected день, дня, дни, дней , "day, day's, days, days'".

Prestopped nasals area also found in Australia. Eastern Arrernte has both prenasalized stops and prestopped nasals, but it does not have word-initial consonant clusters. Compare  "good" (with nasal stop),  "make" (with prenasalized stop),  "coolamon" (with prestopped nasal).

There is little or no phonetic difference between a "prenasalized stop" and a cluster. It is similar for prestopped nasals. The difference is essentially one of phonological analysis. For example, languages with word-initial  (or ) but no other
word-initial clusters, will often be analyzed as having a unitary prenasalized stop rather than a cluster of nasal + stop. Even in such cases, however, alternative analyses are possible. Ladefoged and Maddieson investigated one such claimed case and concluded that the two sounds were better analyzed as /nd/ and /nnd/, respectively.

Final consonants with nasal release
However, some languages such as Vietnamese and Malay, which are generally described as having no audible release in final stops, actually have a short nasal release  in such cases. Since all final stops in these two languages are voiceless, the nasal release is voiceless as well.

Although the difference is commonly chalked up to aspiration, final nasal release is contrastive in Wolof:

{| class=wikitable
|+Contrasting releases in Wolof
!colspan=2|Nasal release!!colspan=2|Aspirated release
|-
|||'to drown'||||'to be thin'
|-
|||'bridle rope'||||'white chalk'
|}

See also
 Lateral release (phonetics)
 No audible release
 Prestopped nasal consonant

References

Consonants
Release